Roy Matthews (10 September 1926 – March 1992) was a British archer. He competed in the men's individual event at the 1972 Summer Olympics.

References

1926 births
1992 deaths
British male archers
Olympic archers of Great Britain
Archers at the 1972 Summer Olympics
20th-century British people